Rocky Creek may refer to:

Australia 
 Rocky Creek Dam, a water catchment dam on the North Coast of New South Wales, Australia
 Rocky Creek, Queensland, a locality in the Toowoomba Region

United States 
Rocky Creek, Florida, an unincorporated community in Hillsborough County
Rocky Creek (Oregon), a coastal stream in Lincoln County
Rocky Creek (Current River), a stream in Missouri
Rocky Creek (South Carolina), a tributary of the Broad River (Carolinas)
Rocky Creek (Texas), a stream in Victoria County
Rocky Creek (Wisconsin), a stream in Wisconsin
Rocky Creek Bridge (California), a bridge in Monterey County
Rocky Creek Bridge No. 01089, a highway bridge along the Oregon coast

See also
 Rock Creek (disambiguation)